Raúl Enrique Estévez (born 21 January 1978 in Lomas de Zamora, Argentina) is a former Argentine footballer.

Nicknamed "El Pipa", Estévez has played for San Lorenzo, Boca Juniors, Colón de Santa Fe and Racing Club of Argentina; Botafogo of Brazil; and Universidad de Chile and Unión Española of Chile.

Career

Argentina and Brazil
He started his career in Club Atlético San Lorenzo de Almagro in Argentina.

In 1995, he was promoted to the first team and made his debut that same year. In 2001 he was champion with San Lorenzo of the Torneo Clausura 2001 and the Copa Mercosur.

In 2003, he signed with Boca Juniors, which won the national and international tournaments, Torneo Clausura 2003 and Copa Libertadores.

In 2004, he signed with Botafogo where he remained for one semester. In the middle of the year Estévez returned to Argentina, and signed with Colón de Santa Fe where he remained one year. Thereafter, he signed with Racing Club de Avellaneda in which he was a key man in the first matches. A year later he went to Europe.

Europe
In 2006, Estvéz arrived in Europe, to play for Academica Coimbra in Portugal. However, due to the lack of opportunities during 2007, Estévez abandoned the club, and became a Free agent.

Chile
In 2008, Estevéz received an offer to join Universidad de Chile which he accepted. In the first semester Estévez was not meeting the club's expectations and his future with the club for the second semester was in question. On May 11, Estévez played against O'Higgins where he scored two goals, which secured his place in the second semester. In the second semester Estévez played well, participating in all matches and scoring six goals. However in December he had problems with the club's management and left the club.

In 2009, he signed for Unión Española for whom he played regularly, nearly winning the Chilean national tournament. In the second semester he scored a goal against Vélez Sarsfield in the Copa Sudamericana.

Titles
 San Lorenzo: 2001 Clausura Primera Division Argentina
 San Lorenzo: 2001 Copa Mercosur
 Boca Juniors: 2003 Apertura Primera Division Argentina
 Boca Juniors: 2003 Copa Libertadores

External links
 Raúl Estévez at BDFA.com.ar 
 Raúl Estévez – post 2000 Argentine Primera statistics at Futbol XXI  
 

1978 births
Living people
Argentine footballers
Argentine expatriate footballers
Association football forwards
San Lorenzo de Almagro footballers
Boca Juniors footballers
Boca Unidos footballers
Botafogo de Futebol e Regatas players
Club Atlético Colón footballers
Racing Club de Avellaneda footballers
Associação Académica de Coimbra – O.A.F. players
Universidad de Chile footballers
Unión Española footballers
Argentine Primera División players
Chilean Primera División players
Primeira Liga players
Expatriate footballers in Brazil
Expatriate footballers in Chile
Expatriate footballers in Portugal
People from Lomas de Zamora
Argentine expatriate sportspeople in Brazil
Sportspeople from Buenos Aires Province